Cinepoetry (or cinepoem) originally meant arts of motion pictures with poetic sense but came to mean cinematic poetry (or poem).

Examples in former meaning
Man Ray's films
Matt Robinson's films
Stark Electric Jesus　(India)

Examples in latter meaning
Benjamin Fondane's poems
Fuyuhiko Kitagawa's or Iku Takenaka's poems
For Rent　(Sakutaro Hagiwara)

See also
Closet screenplay
Video poetry
Video art
Lesescenario

Reference books
Cinepoetry: Imaginary Cinemas in French Poetry (Verbal Arts: Studies in Poetics) by Christophe Wall-romana
Cinepoems and others by Benjamin Fondane
Scenario's Charm(シナリオの魅力 Shinario No Miryoku) by Fuyuhiko Kitagawa   
ASIN: B000JBAEZQ

References

Genres of poetry
Film genres